SS Northern Star may refer to:
SS Empire Caribou, launched on 23 July 1919 and renamed Northern Star when sold to the American Star Line in 1920
SS Northern Star (1962), an Ocean Liner of the Shaw-Savill line

See also
MS Northern Star, ferry in service with P&O Irish Sea and Dart Line, 2002–04